Aloysius Schlör (1805-1852) was an Austrian Catholic ascetic writer.

See also
Catholic Church in Austria

References

Austrian Roman Catholics
Austrian male writers
1805 births
1852 deaths